The State Historical Society of Iowa (SHSI), a division of the Iowa Department of Cultural Affairs, serves as the official historical repository for the State of Iowa and also provides grants, public education, and outreach about Iowa history and archaeology. The SHSI maintains a museum, library, archives, and research center in Des Moines and a research library in Iowa City, as well as several historic sites in Iowa. It was founded in 1857 in Iowa City, where it was first affiliated with the University of Iowa. As the organization grew in size and collections, it became a separate state agency headquartered near the Iowa Capitol in Des Moines.

SHSI publications

The SHSI currently publishes the Annals of Iowa. In the past it published the Iowa Heritage Illustrated, Goldfinch, the Iowa Journal of History and Politics, and the Iowa Historical Record. It also currently produces an e-newsletter, the Iowa Historian.

State and federal regulation
The SHSI is part of the Iowa Department of Cultural affairs, both organizations coordinate the State Historic Preservation Office of Iowa, Iowa's designated SHPO, which reviews state and federally mandated laws and regulations relating to historic and archaeological work.

State Historical Museum of Iowa
Located in Des Moines, Iowa, the State Historical Museum of Iowa is the society's main museum.  Exhibits show Iowa's growth and development and its citizens.

SHSI historic sites
Abbie Gardner Sharp Cabin in Arnolds Park, Iowa
American Gothic House in Eldon, Iowa
Blood Run Site in Lyon County, Iowa
Matthew Edel Blacksmith Shop in Haverhill, Iowa
Montauk Historic Governor's Home in Clermont, Iowa
Plum Grove Historic House in Iowa City
Toolesboro Mound Group in Louisa County, Iowa
Western Historic Trails Center in Council Bluffs, Iowa

See also 
History of Iowa
Iowa archaeology
National Register of Historic Places listings in Iowa
List of National Historic Landmarks in Iowa
Iowa Archeological Society
Preservation Iowa

References

External links
State Historical Society of Iowa

 
State historical societies of the United States
Historic preservation organizations in the United States
State agencies of Iowa
Museum organizations
Museums in Des Moines, Iowa
History museums in Iowa
Historical societies in Iowa
State history organizations of the United States
1857 establishments in Iowa
Organizations established in 1857